The current flag of Galmudug was adopted on 17 June 2015.

Initially, it flew the Somali flag, but sometimes above the star a white inscription “State Somaliyya” was added.  The second flag used was white with the arms in center. These arms were the Somali national arms between laurel branches, and below a blue ribbon with the white letters GMS. The third flag was light blue with green triangle at the hoist, fimbriated in white, bearing within a white crescent and star.  

On this was changed the flag to a new design which comprises horizontal stripes of yellow, blue, and green. In the blue central stripe is a white five pointed star.

Gallery

References

Galmudug
Flags of Somalia
2015 establishments in Somalia